Nathan J. Hirsh (Romania, 1872 - New York City, March 19, 1956) was an American film producer who co-founded Aywon Film Corporation and Pioneer Film Corporation. He produced or co-produced twenty features of the 20s and 30s, and featured in a dozen movies as presenter.

Selected filmography
The Evolution of Man, also known as Jack the Man-Ape (1920)
 Western Racketeers (1934)
 The Outlaw Tamer (1935)

References

External links

1872 births
1956 deaths
Romanian emigrants to the United States
American people of Romanian-Jewish descent